The Three Guardsmen is the name popularized in Old West literature describing three lawmen who became legendary in their pursuit of many outlaws of the late 19th century. Deputy U.S. Marshals Bill Tilghman (1854–1924), Chris Madsen (1851–1944), and Heck Thomas (1850–1912) were "The Three Guardsmen", working under U.S. Marshal Evett "E.D." Nix.

Career and notoriety
Beginning in 1889, they began "cleaning up" part of what became the State of Oklahoma.  Widely considered honest, dutiful, and capable, they were responsible for suppressing much of the outlaw element in the Indian Territory and environs, reportedly arresting in excess of some 300 desperadoes during the next decade, and killing several others. All three had the reputation of being dauntless in their pursuit, ignoring bad weather, and each was known for their unique tracking abilities. Ironically the nickname "Three Guardsmen" was given to them by outlaws they pursued. Heck Thomas' relentless pursuit of the Dalton Gang was specifically mentioned by gang member Emmett Dalton as one reason the Dalton Gang attempted to rob two banks simultaneously in Coffeyville, Kansas – to make one big score so that they could leave the territory for a time.  Resistance from the lawmen and citizens of Coffeyville to this robbery ended the gang with the deaths of most of its members.

They are most famous for their relentless pursuit of the  Wild Bunch, or Doolin Gang, which included surviving members of the Dalton Gang.  The three lawmen eliminated many of the Doolin Gang by systematically killing gang members who resisted them and arresting those who would surrender. Deputy Marshal Heck Thomas killed gang leader Bill Doolin. Deputy Marshal Chris Madsen led the posse that killed Doolin gang members "Dynamite Dan" Clifton and Richard "Little Dick" West. Deputy Marshal Tilghman was ultimately responsible for the death of Doolin gang member William F. "Little Bill" Raidler. Other gang members were also captured or killed by them.

Later years
Heck Thomas retired in 1905, and in 1907 accepted a Chief of Police position in Lawton, Oklahoma. He died in 1912 of Bright's disease.

Bill Tilghman retired in 1910 and was elected to the Oklahoma State Senate. On Halloween night, 1924, and at the age of 70, Tilghman was murdered by a corrupt prohibition agent named Wiley Lynn, while serving as town Marshal for Cromwell, Oklahoma. Cromwell at the time was a wild town full of brothels, pool halls and saloons. One month after his death, the entire town was burned to the ground – no building was left standing. Chris Madsen and other former law enforcement friends of Tilghman were believed to have been responsible, but no investigation into the arsons was ever conducted.  The town of Cromwell never recovered; as of the 2000 census, its population was less than 300.

Madsen had retired in 1905, and died in 1944 at the age of 93.

References

External links
The Three Guardsmen

United States Marshals
Pre-statehood history of Oklahoma
People of the American Old West